This is a filmography of Grammy Award-winning rap artist Method Man, who is also an actor. In his film and TV work, he's sometimes credited as Cliff 'Method Man' Smith.

Actor

Film

Television

Video games

References

External links
 

Male actor filmographies
Director filmographies
American filmographies